is a former Japanese football player.

Playing career
Minami was born in Iruma on November 17, 1983. After graduating from high school, he joined J1 League club Urawa Reds based in his local Saitama Prefecture in 2002. On June 4, 2005, he debuted as substitute defender against Omiya Ardija in J.League Cup. However he could only play this match until 2006. In August 2006, he moved to newly was promoted to J2 League club, Ehime FC. He became a regular player as center back in 2006 season. However his opportunity to play decreased from 2007. In 2009, he moved to Japan Football League club V-Varen Nagasaki. However he could not play many matches and retired end of 2010 season.

Club statistics

References

External links

1983 births
Living people
Association football people from Saitama Prefecture
Japanese footballers
J1 League players
J2 League players
Japan Football League players
Urawa Red Diamonds players
Ehime FC players
V-Varen Nagasaki players
Association football defenders